The 2015 Ankara Cup was a professional tennis tournament played on indoor hard courts. It was the fourth edition of the tournament and part of the 2015 ITF Women's Circuit, offering a total of $50,000 in prize money. It took place in Ankara, Turkey, on 14–20 December, 2015.

Singles main draw entrants

Seeds 

 1 Rankings as of 7 December 2015.

Other entrants 
The following players received wildcards into the singles main draw:
  Berfu Cengiz
  İnci Öğüt
  Selin Övünç
  Müge Topsel

The following players received entry from the qualifying draw:
  Michaela Hončová
  Maria Marfutina
  Ganna Poznikhirenko
  Oana Georgeta Simion

The following player received entry by a lucky loser spot:
  Ekaterina Yashina

The following player received entry using a protected ranking:
  María José Martínez Sánchez

Champions

Singles

 Ivana Jorović def.  Çağla Büyükakçay, 7–6(7–3), 3–6, 6–2

Doubles

 María José Martínez Sánchez /  Marina Melnikova def.  Paula Kania /  Lesley Kerkhove, 6–4, 5–7, [10–8]

External links 
 2015 Ankara Cup at ITFtennis.com
 Official website 

2010s in Ankara
2015 in Turkish women's sport
2015 in Turkish tennis
2015 ITF Women's Circuit
Ankara Cup
December 2015 sports events in Turkey